East Leake Academy is an academy located in East Leake in the Rushcliffe area of Nottinghamshire, England. The school describes itself as specialising in information communication technology (ICT) and mathematics. The current principal is Blake Francis. The school has a student capacity of 1386. In September 2003, the school moved into a £20m new building, built with Private Finance Initiative funding, and rented from Alfred McAlpine Business Services. The school shares its location with a leisure centre and Lantern Lane Primary & Nursery School. In September 2012, the school was changed from a comprehensive to an academy after successfully earning academy status in 2010, in September 2012 the name was also changed from Harry Carlton Comprehensive School to East Leake Academy.

Results
The school achieves higher GCSE results than both the national and Nottinghamshire averages although the highest recent result was in 2003 when 70% gained 5 A–C grades.

History
The school was designed by Donald Gibson, the county architect, to accommodate 300 pupils. It was intended to reflect its rural location and allowed for the school to keep its own livestock. It was opened on 27 July 1957 by Brigadier Martin Redmayne, DSO, TD, PC. The school was then called the East Leake County Secondary School. The first head was Mr Tyler.

A team from the school won a national competition in 2001 to predict UK base interest rates organised by the Bank of England. The school received £10,000.

The school was rebuilt in 2002 as part of a private finance initiative. At that time it was named after Harry Carlton. Before this the school had been flooded three times in one year.

References

External links
Christmas Carols at Radio Nottingham

Educational institutions established in 1956
Secondary schools in Nottinghamshire
Academies in Nottinghamshire
1956 establishments in England
East Leake